Road Hard is a 2015 comedy film directed by Adam Carolla and written by Carolla and Kevin Hench. The film stars Carolla, Diane Farr, Larry Miller, David Alan Grier, and David Koechner. The film was released in selected theaters and on video on demand on March 6, 2015. This was Windell Middlebrooks' last film, as he died three days after the premiere.

Plot
Years after his movie and sitcom career has run dry, Bruce Madsen is reduced to headlining one dingy comedy club after another, spending his nights in budget hotel rooms, and flying coach while his former fans sit in first class. He has only one question: What the hell happened? Amidst trying to revitalize his career, rekindle his love life, and put his daughter through college, Bruce knows one thing for sure - he must get off the road - hard. Road Hard is the story of that journey.

Cast
 Adam Carolla as Bruce Madsen
 David Koechner as Chad
 Diane Farr as Sarah
 Larry Miller as "Babydoll"
 Jay Mohr as Jack Taylor
 David Alan Grier as Michael
 Windell Middlebrooks as Reggie
 Howie Mandel as himself
 Dana Gould as himself
 Philip Rosenthal as Phil
 Cynthy Wu as Tina Madsen
 Alison Rosen as Jessica, a flight attendant
 Illeana Douglas
 Steve Hofstetter
 Jenna Mourey as Jenna Marbles

Production
The film was crowdfunded using FundAnything.com. Filming began on April 14, 2014, and ended on May 10, 2014.

Release
The film was released in selected theaters and on Video-on-Demand on March 6, 2015.

Reception
Road Hard received mixed reviews from critics. The review aggregator website Rotten Tomatoes reported a 55% approval rating, with a rating average of 5.6/10, based on 22 reviews. On Metacritic, which assigns a normalized rating out of 100 based on reviews from critics, the film has a score of 50 based on 12 reviews, indicating "mixed or average reviews".

References

External links
 Official Website

 

2015 films
2015 comedy films
American comedy films
2010s English-language films
2010s American films